The National Assembly is the bicameral legislature of the nation of Belize.  It is divided into the House of Representatives, with 31 members, elected by universal suffrage, and the Senate, with 13 members, appointed by the Governor-General in consultation with the Prime Minister and the Leader of the Opposition. The presiding officer of the House is the Speaker, while the Senate is presided over by the President.

History 

The National Assembly of Belize, known as British Honduras prior to independence in 1981, was first introduced on 31 December 1963, replacing the unicameral Legislative Assembly.

The National Assembly has the power to debate and create laws based on the Constitution. It typically meets, both House and Senate, once a month, with other meetings called as necessary.

Since 1970, following  the relocation of the capital to Belmopan, the Parliament has sat at National Assembly Building, Belmopan in the Cayo District.

House of Representatives
The House of Representatives is called the Lower House. It consists of 31 members, who are elected by the people in a general election every five years. Each member represents one constituency. Members of the House include both members of the ruling party and members of the opposition who won their seats in general election. The House of Representatives is presided over during their meetings by a speaker. The speaker's main responsibility is to maintain order and control. The House of Representatives passes bills, debates national issues and approves government budget.

Senate
The Senate is the Upper House. The Senate discusses and confirms bills that are sent from the House of Representatives. It is made up of 13 members who are all appointed by the Governor General. The President of the Senate presides over meetings.

 6 senators are appointed on the advice of the Prime Minister
 3 senators are appointed on the advice of the Leader of the Opposition
 1 is appointed on the advice of the Belize Chamber of Commerce and the Belize Business Bureau
 1 is appointed on the advice of the Belize Council of Churches
 1 is appointed on the advice of the Belize National Trade and Union Congress
 1 is appointed on the advice of the Non-Government Organizations (NGO)

Lawmaking process
The lawmaking process includes the following steps:

 Cabinet accepts an idea from a minister and discuss it. Legal draftsmen draft the bill.
 Approval of the bill by Cabinet.
 The Bill is introduced into the  House of Representatives for the 1st Reading.
 House committee meetings to hear public opinions and possible changes to the bill.
 The bill is debated in the House of Representatives. ( 2nd Reading)
 The bill is accepted and voted upon ( 3rd Reading) if it  is passed by a majority votes it becomes an act.
 The act goes through the same three stages/ readings in the Senate before it becomes a law.
 Once the act passes the Senate, it is sent to the Governor General for his signature. The act becomes a law.

See also 
Politics of Belize
List of legislatures by country
Prime Minister of Belize
Governor-General of Belize

References

External links 
 
Government of Belize
http://www.oas.org/juridico/PDFs/mesicic5_blz_resp_annex5.pdf

 
Belize
Government of Belize
Politics of Belize
Political organisations based in Belize
Belize
1963 establishments in the British Empire